Ebbie or Miracle at Christmas: Ebbie's Story is a 1995 TV movie directed by George Kaczender, written by Ed Redlich, and starring Susan Lucci in the title role. It is a gender-reversed retelling of the 1843 novella A Christmas Carol by Charles Dickens, with a hard-hearted female character in place of the miserly Ebenezer Scrooge.

Plot
The title character is businesswoman Elizabeth "Ebbie" Scrooge. Ebbie has never appreciated Christmas, and has been rotten to the holidays. She doesn't give to the needy, doesn't care about her employees at Dobson's (the store she owns), and most of all, she works on Christmas. One night, the ghost of her partner, Jake Marley (counterpart to Dickens' Jacob Marley character, played here by Jeffrey DeMunn), haunts her. She is soon brought back to a deserted Dobson's, where the Ghosts of Christmas Past (Jennifer Clement and Nicole Parker) show her the Christmases she has celebrated. They take her to a very significant Christmas when her sister Francine (Molly Parker) died after nearly miscarrying her niece (Ebbie believes that Francine would have survived had she not left her alone to attend a party); it is also the Christmas she met her soon-to-be boyfriend Paul (Ron Lea). They show her many other Christmases, including another grim one when Paul leaves her because she values work over him, when she and Marley take over Dobson's, and finally, the previous year, when Marley died.

The Ghost of Christmas Present (Lorena Gale) shows her the life of her assistant Roberta Cratchet (Wendy Crewson), her daughter Martha (Laura Harris) and her son Tiny Tim (Taran Noah Smith). Next, she sees the party that she is invited to every year by her niece (also Molly Parker), but has always declined; everyone toast Ebbie, but her niece does not drink (the reason being that she is pregnant). She sees Paul and his wife and children, and Ignorance and Poverty in the form of feral homeless children, while the ghost throws all of her harsh words back at her. Then, the Ghost of Christmas Future shows her a terrible future where Tiny Tim has died, Dobson's is shut down, and she herself is hit by a car, has no visitors in the hospital, and dies flat broke.

After experiencing all those visions, Ebbie becomes a better person. She is shown the next morning, whereupon she bids good morning to the doorman. She also orders a large turkey for the Cratchets, donates money for the poor children, buys a coat for a homeless woman (Elan Ross Gibson) and offers her a job, gives Rita a raise (so Rita no longer needs to work her second job), gives a better job to Roberta, and finally attends the party her niece has been inviting her to. The movie ends with Ebbie at the Cratchets' house, eating dinner with them.

Cast
 Susan Lucci as Elizabeth "Ebbie" Scrooge
 Wendy Crewson as Roberta "Robbie" Cratchet
 Ron Lea as Paul
 Molly Parker as Francine "Frannie", Mother and Daughter
 Lorena Gale as Rita / Ghost of Christmas Present
 Jennifer Clement as Ghost of Christmas Past #1
 Nicole Parker as Ghost of Christmas Past #2
 Susan Hogan as Mrs. Dobson
 Kevin McNulty as Mr. Dobson
 Taran Noah Smith as Tim "Tiny Tim" Cratchet
 Jeffrey DeMunn as Jake Marley
 Adrienne Carter as Little Ebbie
 Bill Croft as Luther / Spirit of Christmas Yet to Come
 Elan Ross Gibson as Homeless Woman
 Laura Harris as Martha Cratchet
 Sarah Hayward as Nurse #2
 Maria Herrera as Nurse #1
 Gary Jones as Floor Manager
 Tamsin Kelsey as Mrs. Taylor
 Karin Konoval as Ebbie's Mother
 David Lovgren as Michael
 Tom McBeath as Van Munson
 Hrothgar Mathews as Ralph
 Larry Musser as Ebbie's Father
 Malcolm Stewart as Patterson
 Carolyn Adair as Pregnant Friend
 Liza Huber as 70's Girl (uncredited)
 Tong Lung as Vietnamese Store Owner (uncredited)
 Trevor Lawrence Young as Caroler (uncredited)

See also
 Adaptations of A Christmas Carol
 List of Christmas films

Sources

1995 television films
1995 films
English-language Canadian films
American Christmas drama films
Canadian Christmas drama films
Canadian drama television films
Christmas television films
Films based on A Christmas Carol
Television shows based on A Christmas Carol
1990s Christmas drama films
1995 drama films
Films directed by George Kaczender
American drama television films
1990s American films
1990s Canadian films